Mir Pur is one of the 51 union councils of Abbottabad District in the Khyber Pakhtunkhwa Province of Pakistan. It is located at an altitude of 1251 metres (4107 feet) and lies in the west of the district. The population of the union council Mirpur was 46,206 in the 2017 census. Now the government have established this union council into three village councils. These are VC1, VC2 and VC3. Majority of the residents of Mirpur are Jadoon, Awan, Tanoli and Gujjars.

Mirpur is one of the highly populated union council in District Abbottabad. Surrounded by beautiful mountains from all four sides makes this Union council Mirpur beautiful place among different Union councils. It is popular for its natural water spring named as Chashma Mirpur (Saara) where fresh water comes from the naturally built waterways from inside the mountain. 

People of Mirpur are very hospitable and kind. They have their own traditions and culture. Football is the main sport of the people among other sports. Mir Pur has produced big names in the world of football and several players played for the national and provincial clubs.

The youth of Mirpur is trying to find new ways of opportunities to earn big names in several fields of life. Comsats University Islamabad, Abbottabad Campus is located in the Union council Mirpur.

References

Union councils of Abbottabad District

fr:Mirpur (district d'Abbottabad)